Into It. Over It./Such Gold is a split EP between American Emo revival bands Into It. Over It. and Such Gold. The EP was released on May 20, 2011 through No Sleep Records and Mightier Than Sword Records.

Track listing

Personnel
Into It. Over It.
Evan Thomas Weiss – vocals, guitar, bass

Other Musicians

Nick Wakim – drums
Nathan Ellis – backing vocals
Kate Grube – keyboard/vocals

Such Gold
 Devan Bentley - drums
 Skylar Sarkis - guitar/vocals
 Ben Kotin - vocals
 Nate Derby - guitar
 Devon Hubbard - bass/vocals

References

2011 EPs
Split EPs